Statuette of a Woman from the 6th to 5th centuries BC, is a bronze statue discovered in Ayrum, Armenia. It is included in the History Museum of Armenia's collection under the number 2225-1.

Description 
The figure is a miniature cast figure of a nude woman standing on the platform corner, with long legs, high hair, a flat face, and a large, straight nose. The eyes and ears are pronounced by round dimples. On her neck, she has on a thick necklace. Extended in her left hand, there is a pear-shaped jug, her right elbow is bent holding a drinking horn. Figures with forms of female deities, make use of temples for various ritual ceremonies. The nude female statuettes were linked with the ritual belief of fertility and incorporated with the goddess Anahit, who as a mother-goddess was also included in the Battle, fertility, and functions of the goddess of love, being the gardening, wheat, and patron goddess of animals.

References

See also
 View from the Bronze Age, album-catalog, History Museum of Armenia, 2010
 Hasmik Israelian - Cults and Beliefs in the Late Bronze Age of Armenia, Yerevan, 1973

6th-century BC sculptures
Bronze Age art
Archaeology of Armenia
Armenian art
Ancient art in metal